Richard Daniel "Rick" Sanchez is one of the two eponymous characters from the Adult Swim animated television series Rick and Morty and resulting franchise. Created by Justin Roiland and Dan Harmon, and voiced by the former in the first six seasons of the series and promotional media, and Yōhei Tadano in Rick and Morty: The Anime, Sanchez is a misanthropic alcoholic scientist inspired by Christopher Lloyd's Dr. Emmett "Doc" Brown from Back to the Future and Reed Richards / Mr. Fantastic from Marvel Comics. In September 2021, Lloyd portrayed Sanchez himself in a series of promotional interstitials for the series.

Known for his reckless, nihilistic behavior and pessimistic personality, the character has been well received. Rick C-137 is a sociopathic mad scientist who seems to know everything in the universe and thus finds life a traumatizing and pointless experience. Following the murder of his wife Diane and daughter Beth Sanchez in his native reality (C-137) by his parallel self Rick Prime, Rick dedicates his life to hunting Prime down, developing inter-dimensional travel and building a wall around the segment of the multiverse where Rick is "The Smartest Man in the Universe", dubbed the Central Finite Curve, to narrow his search, massacring countless alternate versions of himself in the process of hunting down Prime before resigning himself to failure, founding the Citadel of Ricks out of the survivors, and retiring to move in with the family of an adult version of Beth (Smith) from Prime's own native reality (whom Prime had abandoned when Beth was a teenager) out of the slim hope of Prime one day returning so Rick could complete his vendetta, consisting of his son-in-law Jerry and teenage grandchildren Summer and Morty Smith, going on a series of adventures with the latter, over the course of which events in the first and fifth seasons lead to Morty and Summer having two children of their own, Mortimer Junior and Naruto.

The first three volumes of the Rick and Morty comic series follow the Rick and Morty of Dimension C-132 while most issues of subsequent volumes (following the "Head-Space" arc in which Rick C-132 is killed) follow the main Rick (C-137) and Morty (Prime) from the television series, with the final volume ("The Rickoning") and Rick and Morty Go to Hell following another alternate Rick (and Morty) identified as Devil Rick in the latter series, and featuring a Girl Rick designed after cosplayer Santana Maynard by series writer Kyle Starks; the video game Pocket Mortys meanwhile follows the Rick and Morty of C-123. The main character Rick of the franchise and their alternative selves have received a positive critical reception.

Fictional character biography

Backstory
Rick Sanchez from Earth (Dimension C-137) is the widowed father of Beth Smith, and the grandfather of Morty and Summer Smith. In the fifth season, it is revealed that after the death of his daughter Beth and his wife Diane in his home reality by a Rick from another universe (Rick Prime) who once offered him help, C-137 Rick develops a portal gun and spends the following decades travelling the infinite multiverse in search of the specific alternate version of himself whom he believes responsible for killing them, befriending Birdperson and becoming a leading figure in the revolution against the Galactic Federation throughout his mid-30s. After being rejected by Birdperson, Rick returns to his journey of vengeance, before ultimately becoming the leader of a fledgling "Citadel of Ricks". The Citadel had originally formed to oppose him after he had killed a number of alternate versions of himself on his journey of vengeance, and under his guidance oversaw the binding of the multiverse's Ricks into a "Central Finite Curve" in which they are all the "Smartest Man in the Universe", manipulating the flow of realities in which his daughter lived to ensure that she met Jerry Smith in order to produce an endless number of hypothetical grandchildren, allowing them to hide from the Federation using their brainwaves. Depressed, Rick eventually abandons the Citadel and casts himself into the multiverse once again, crashing into the garage of a now-adult, living version of Beth of Rick Prime's reality, where Prime had abandoned her and Diane twenty years prior instead. He befriended her son, that reality's Morty Smith, and frequently traveled with him on adventures through space, visiting other planets and dimensions with him (and occasionally Summer Smith). In the third season of the show, it is revealed that he is at least 70 years old.

Television series

Season One 

Rick's trademark catchphrase in the first season (and also appearing as a variation in the second season) is "Wubba Lubba Dub-Dub", first introduced in the episode "Meeseeks and Destroy". In Birdperson's native language, the catchphrase translates to "I am in great pain, please help me", an indication of Rick's depression. Justin Roiland revealed the catchphrase was created by mistake when he messed up reading the script; he was supposed to say "wub wub wub wub wub".

In the episode "Rick Potion #9", Rick reveals his disdain towards love, in which he claims that it is "a chemical reaction that compels animals to breed". When Rick and Morty irreversibly mutate all humans on Earth except for their family members, they abandon the dimension (and their family in that dimension) for a new one. Rick locates a universe in which the alternate version of himself has undone the damage inflicted by the love potion, but where the new dimension's Rick and Morty have been killed, allowing the C-137 Rick and Morty Prime to take their place. Despite Morty's trauma concerning this knowledge, Rick is nonchalant about moving to the new dimension.

Rick's intelligence is portrayed to transcend that of metaphysical beings, as demonstrated in the episode "Something Ricked This Way Comes", where he outsmarts Satan / Mr. Needful.

In the episode "Close Rick-counters of the Rick Kind", after numerous Ricks in alternate dimensions are murdered, the Trans-Dimensional Council of Ricks accuses Rick C-137 and orders for him to be arrested. Rick C-137 finds himself captured by an "evil" Rick (in actuality controlled by a Morty), but is saved by a legion of alternate-dimension Mortys led by Morty Prime.

Season Two 

In the second season premiere, "A Rickle in Time", Rick nearly sacrifices himself to save Morty, but saves his own life when he realizes that doing so is possible. In the episode "Get Schwifty", it is revealed that Rick was once in a rock band called the Flesh Curtains, alongside Birdperson and Squanchy. In the episode "Big Trouble in Little Sanchez", Rick transfers his consciousness into a younger clone of himself, whom he calls "Tiny Rick". He soon becomes anguished in his new body, and manages to return to his older true form, and murders a line of other clones he produced.

In "The Ricks Must Be Crazy", Rick reveals that he powers his flying car with a battery that contains a miniature universe, or microverse, whose inhabitants unknowingly provide the required electricity. The inhabitants cease doing this after one of their scientists does the same thing for his own universe, and discovers that this is what Rick has done to his universe. Rick remorselessly destroys the miniature universe inside his own miniature universe, killing everyone inside. Nearing the end of the episode, Rick knows that his own microverse would choose to power his battery, or he would dispose of it and create a new one; as he put it, once he got out of the battery,  he'd have one of two options: "either I'd have to toss out a broken battery, or the battery wouldn't be broken.".

In the second season's finale, "The Wedding Squanchers", Rick and his family attend Birdperson's wedding, where Birdperson is betrayed and killed by his bride Tammy, a double agent for the Galactic Federation. The family is forced to inhabit an unusually small yet Earth-like planet, as they cannot return to Earth due to Rick's status as a wanted criminal. Rick turns himself into the Federation to allow his family to return home, and is incarcerated on a prison planet under the charges of having committed "everything".

Season Three 

The premiere episode of the series' third season, "The Rickshank Rickdemption" shows a possible origin for Rick, in which he was a well-meaning scientist who loved his wife Diane and daughter Beth, but had an encounter with a member of a militant group of Ricks who had achieved inter-dimensional travel during his own initial testing of a prototype inter-dimensional portal gun, who offered him the secret to creating the device, and joining their organization. Shortly after his refusal, and his pledge to quit science forever, a bomb was sent through a portal, killing Diane and Beth. Rick claims that this was a fake memory he created in order to trick his interrogator into implanting a virus into the mind-reading device he was attached to, allowing him to hijack his body and escape from the Federation prison, having actually turned himself in to access the Federation's supercomputer and wipe it out financially, before taking out the Council of Ricks while saving Morty and Summer. At the end of the episode, after indirectly convincing Beth to divorce Jerry for trying to convince the family to sell him out, Rick again insists, in a rant to Morty, that the death of his wife and daughter as depicted was a fake memory; in the fifth season, his wife and daughter from his home reality are confirmed to have been caught in an explosion, with both being killed, the fake part of the memory having been Rick immediately developing an inter-dimensional portal gun himself to find a new family, rather than what he did in actuality: spent months developing the technology before spending the next thirty years attempting to track down the Rick in question (Rick Prime). Months later, Rick reluctantly attends family therapy under Dr. Wong in "Pickle Rick".

In "The ABC's of Beth", Beth learns from Rick that her childhood magical fantasy world of Froopyland was an actual place all Ricks had made for her as a child: a real procedurally-generated and childproofed pocket dimension he created for Beth, and that her memories of her childhood friend Tommy Lipnip getting lost inside of it are real. Upon reentering to locate Tommy, Rick discovers that the animals have become predatory and dangerous from segments of human DNA, with Tommy having survived to adulthood via a combination of bestiality and cannibalism. After Tommy accuses Beth of deliberately trapping him in the dimension as a child out of jealousy for his family, pushing him into a honey swamp in a murder attempt before leaving him there, Rick takes himself and Beth back without Tommy. After Beth accuses him of being a bad parent, Rick counters that he made Froopyland to keep her occupied because she was a violent child, and has no doubt Tommy's claims were true. Beth tries to go back to reason with Tommy, but ends up killing him and his offspring. Back at home, pondering whether she is evil, Beth is presented with the option by Rick of having a replacement clone of her created, so that she will be free to travel the universe without abandoning her family; on rewatching his own self-erased memory of the incident in "Star Mort Rickturn of the Jerri", Rick learns that Beth asked him to decide for himself whether he wanted her in his life, and his response was to use a centrifuge to randomize who was the original after creating a clone, having been unable to answer, in the present finally admitting to himself that he is "a terrible father". In "The Rickchurian Mortydate", while Rick is in a feud with the President, Beth begins to fear she might be the clone, with Rick's phrasing of the answer leading her to an existential crisis, and ultimately reuniting with Jerry and renewing their marriage, much to Rick's frustration. The season ends with the Smith family happy to be together again, although Rick is disappointed about losing his dominant position.

Season Four 

In "Star Mort Rickturn of the Jerri", Space Beth (the Beth who went to space, there-becoming the new "Most Wanted" of the Galactic Federation), believing herself to be the clone upon finding a device in her neck, confronts Rick, who reveals that the other Beth also has a device in her neck and claims she is the clone, and the pair go to Shoney's to chat about Space Beth's adventures. After the Federation soon arrives at Earth, demanding Space Beth be handed over, Rick accidentally lets slip that Space Beth might in fact be the clone, and races to Dr. Wong's office (where Beth and Jerry are at counselling) to save Beth from Tammy Gueterman and a squad of soldiers, who have mistaken her for Space Beth. Rick, Beth, and Jerry rendezvous with Space Beth, and both Beths become mad at Rick for his refusal to disclose which is the clone. They are again attacked by Tammy, who takes the Beths prisoner and beams them up to the Federation's ship. Morty and Summer intervene and Rick kills Tammy. The family heads to the ship, with Rick going to free the Beths while Morty and Summer shut off its superlaser before it can annihilate Earth. The Beths escape on their own as Rick is confronted by Phoenixperson (a revived Birdperson), who almost kills him (calling him "a bad friend" for having previously wondered which of them would win in a fight) before being shut down by Space Beth (with Jerry's help). In the aftermath, Rick retrieves the memory tube containing his memory of creating the clone Beth, having erased his own knowledge of which Beth is the original. However, no one in the family is interested in learning the truth. Rick watches the memory nonetheless, only to learn that Beth asked him to decide for himself whether he wanted her in his life. He cloned her, then had the two Beths swapped around until he no longer knew which was the original. After admitting to himself that he is "a terrible father," Rick tries to be a good friend instead and fix Phoenixperson (whose remains he retrieved after the battle), only to be aggressively rejected. Rick is left alone and distraught.

Season Five 

In the fifth season finale "Rickmurai Jack", the Citadel's new President Morty destroys the Central Finite Curve, stripping all Ricks of their title of "Smartest Man in the Universe" and freeing the multiverse of his influence.

Season Six 

In the sixth season premiere "Solaricks", after briefly finally tracking down Rick Prime, Rick and the rest of the Smith family switch realities to a near-identical one (where "parmesan" is pronounced differently), after everyone on their previous reality's Earth are absorbed by Mr. Frundles. After achieving a healthier state of mind after talking with his therapist by "Analyze Piss", Rick finally resumes his search for Rick Prime in "A Rick in King Mortur's Mort", before bringing Morty into his search for Rick Prime (on his request) in the finale, "Ricktional Mortpoon's Rickmas Mortcation".

Personality 
Sanchez has been argued to be a toxic masculine archetype, "Tortured Genius Who Is Lonely and Doesn't Care Because Feelings Are Overrated".

In the pilot, he was revealed to be an atheist, as he tells Summer that "there is no God"; however, Rick is later established to be aware of the existence of various afterlives and gods, just lacking respect for them. Harmon has said that "anarchist" is a close ideological descriptor of Rick.

One of the show's creators and executive producers and voice actor Justin Roiland revealed Sanchez was pansexual. This was shown in "Auto Erotic Assimilation", when Rick re-connects with Unity, an ex-lover who is a collective hive mind of assimilated individuals from the planet they occupy; Rick is further shown to be attracted to planets in the Oni Press comic series backup story "Rick and Morty in: The Most Important Lesson", Rick is further established to be attracted to sentient planets, which later serves as the basis for the fourth season episode "Childrick of Mort", where Rick re-connects with ex-lover Gaia, a planet, whom he met on a "Planets Only" dating website.

Development 
The character was created by Justin Roiland and Dan Harmon, who first met at Channel 101 in the early 2000s. In 2006, Roiland created The Real Animated Adventures of Doc and Mharti, an animated short parodying the Back to the Future characters Emmett "Doc" Brown and Marty McFly, and the precursor to Rick and Morty. The idea for Rick and Morty, in the form of Doc and Mharti was brought up to Adult Swim, and the ideas for a family element and Rick being a grandfather to Morty were developed. Roiland considers his voice for Rick to be a "horrible Doc Brown manic impression". "I was having fun doing these really crappy Doc Brown and Marty McFly impressions. During the middle of a line a burp came out naturally," said Roiland, addressing the creation of Rick's ubiquitous burping habit. Addressing Roiland's and his own portrayals of Rick in a series of promotional interstitials (directed by Paul B. Cummings) compared to Doc Brown, Christopher Lloyd stated "that he felt like Doc and Rick were like two brothers that took different paths".

Reception 
The character has received positive reception. Speaking of Rick's relatability and likability, Dan Harmon stated that "we've all been Rick. But Rick really does have bigger fish to fry than anybody. He understands everything better than us. So you give him the right to be jaded and dismissive and narcissistic and sociopathic". Emily Gaudette of Inverse wrote that fans have "come to love [Rick] over two seasons of misadventures".

David Sims of The Atlantic noted Rick's "bitter amorality" and called the character "a genius who comfortably thinks of himself as the universe's cleverest man and is grounded only by his empathy toward other people, which he tries to suppress as much as possible", therefore writing that Rick's selflessness at the end of the episode "The Wedding Squanchers" is "the most surprising twist possible". Zack Handlen of The A.V. Club wrote that "[Rick] slowly realizing that he loved his grandkids and his daughter (and tolerated his son-in-law) no matter how many times he swore at them helped to give the character some necessary depth", and that "behind all the catchphrases and the crazed energy ... There's something dead and sad and fucked up in the guy".

In popular culture 
Rick appears in the couch gag of the 2015 The Simpsons episode "Mathlete's Feat", with Roiland reprising his role.

In the first episode of the third season, "The Rickshank Redemption", Rick shows a significant interest in Schezwan sauce and insists that his motivation in life is "finding that McNugget sauce" caused a public interest in having the sauce be reinstated on the McDonald's menu, with some fans attempting to recreate the sauce themselves. According to USA Today, McDonald's spokesperson Terri Hickey stated that "We never say never, because when our customers speak, we listen. And to paraphrase some of our most enthusiastic fans, our sauce is so good that it would be worth waiting 9 seasons or 97 years for."

In March 2019, Godzilla: King of the Monsters director Michael Dougherty confirmed the character of Monarch crypto-sonographer Dr. Rick Stanton, played by Bradley Whitford, was based on Rick Sanchez from Rick and Morty, with Dougherty having the character "drink a lot" to keep the character in line with the spirit of Sanchez.

In 2021, Rick appears in Fortnite Battle Royale as part of the Chapter 2 – Season 7 Battle Pass, in Multiversus as part of the game's first season, and in the film Space Jam: A New Legacy, with Roiland reprising his role.

Rick appears in the 2022 Half in the Bag episode "Jayus Ex Mikeina" from Red Letter Media, with Roiland reprising his role, dubbing over Mike Stoklasa, who portrays Rick in the episode.

Family tree

References 

Animated human characters
Fictional alcohol abusers
Fictional anarchists
Fictional atheists and agnostics
Fictional attempted suicides
Fictional career criminals
Fictional characters who break the fourth wall
Fictional cyborgs
Fictional mass murderers
Fictional Hispanic and Latino American people
Fictional nihilists
Fictional inventors
Fictional terrorists
Fictional mad scientists
Fictional scientists in television
Animated villains
Fictional amputees
Fictional prison escapees
Fictional revolutionaries
Fictional space pilots
Fictional pansexuals
Fictional war veterans
Fighting game characters
Atheism in television
Television characters introduced in 2013
Male characters in animated series
Male characters in comics
Rick and Morty characters
LGBT characters in animation
Animated characters introduced in 2013